Erkand Karaj (born 3 May 1982) is an Albanian professional basketball player who currently plays for KB Tirana in the Albanian Albanian Basketball League. He was a member of the Albania national basketball team between 2002 and 2012.

References

External links
2005 Eurobasket FIBA
https://basketball.realgm.com/player/Erkand-Karaj/Summary/42211

1982 births
Living people
Albanian men's basketball players
Basketball players from Tirana
Point guards